Andrew Castle and Nduka Odizor were the defending champions, but did not participate together this year.  Castle partnered Roger Smith, losingin the quarterfinals.  Odizor partnered Cyril Suk, losing in the quarterfinals.

Wayne Ferreira and Stefan Kruger won the title, defeating Paul Haarhuis and Mark Koevermans 6–4, 4–6, 6–4 in the final.

Seeds

  Mark Kratzmann /  Jason Stoltenberg (first round)
  Udo Riglewski /  Michael Stich (first round)
  Broderick Dyke /  John Fitzgerald (first round)
  Paul Haarhuis /  Mark Koevermans (final)

Draw

Draw

References
Draw

Next Generation Adelaide International
1991 ATP Tour
1991 in Australian tennis